Anthony Nicholas Pritzker (born January 7, 1961) is a member of the Pritzker family and an heir to the Hyatt Hotel fortune; he serves as managing partner of the Pritzker Group.

Early life and education
Pritzker was born to a Jewish family, one of the three children of billionaire Donald Pritzker, founder of the Hyatt hotel chain. He graduated from Menlo School and Dartmouth College and received an MBA from the University of Chicago.

Career
From January 1993 to December 1994, he served as president of the Fenestra Corporation. From 1995 to 1996, he was a group executive at the Marmon Group and directed operations at Arzo, MD Tech, Micro-Aire, Oshkosh Door, and Fenestra. From 1996 to 1998, he served as the Regional Vice President of Operations in Asia for Getz Bros. & Co. In 1998, he was appointed by the Marmon Group to oversee Stainless Industrial Companies. From 2000 to 2004, he served as the President of Baker Tanks. He is managing partner of Pritzker Group. He is on the board of directors of Halcyon Ventures, Glenayre, Evercore Partners, and the Signicast Corporation. From 2004 to 2007, he was chairman of AmSafe Partners.

Philanthropy
He is the chair of the UCLA Institute of the Environment and Sustainability board of advisors. He is a member of advisory board at the Center for Asia Pacific Policy of the RAND Corporation. He also sits on the board of trustees of the California Institute of the Arts, the board of directors of Heal the Bay, and the board of overseers of his alma mater, Dartmouth College. He has received awards from the Friends of Sheba Medical Center in Israel, Young Presidents' Organization, and the Brandeis-Bardin Institute. He has made charitable donations to the UCLA School of Law. In 2013, he hosted a benefit for the American Ballet Theatre.

Personal life
As of March 2018, he is the 652nd richest person in the world, and the 219th richest in the United States. He is worth $3.5 billion. He is married to Jeanne Kriser; they have six children and reside in a 49,300-square-feet mansion in Beverly Hills, California, the second largest private residence in Los Angeles. Jeanne is the founder of Foster Care Counts, a charity dedicated to raising awareness of the plight of foster children.

See also 
 The Pritzker Estate
 List of largest houses in the Los Angeles Metropolitan Area
 List of largest houses in the United States

References

1961 births
Living people
American people of Ukrainian-Jewish descent
People from Beverly Hills, California
21st-century American businesspeople
Hyatt people
Anthony Pritzker
American billionaires
21st-century American Jews